Burlington South was the name of a provincial electoral district in Ontario, Canada. It was abolished prior to the 1999 election into Burlington and Ancaster—Dundas—Flamborough—Aldershot. For the 1987, 1990 and 1995 provincial elections it consisted of the City of Burlington south of the Queen Elizabeth Way and Highway 403, except the southeastern corner: east of Appleby Line and south of New Street.

List of Members
George Kerr, Prog. Cons. (1975-1985)
Cam Jackson, Prog. Cons. (1985-1999)

Former provincial electoral districts of Ontario
Politics of Burlington, Ontario